The 2005 NCAA Division I-AA football season, the 2005 season of college football for teams in Division I-AA, began on September 1, 2005, and concluded on December 16, 2005. In the 2005 NCAA Division I-AA Football Championship Game, played in Chattanooga, Tennessee, the Appalachian State Mountaineers defeated the Northern Iowa Panthers.

Rule changes for 2005
There are several rules that have changed for the 2005 season. Following are some highlights:

In an effort to bring spearing under control, the word "intentional" was removed from the rules.
A listing of examples for unsportsmanlike acts was developed in order to encourage more consistent application of the rule. Examples of such acts include, but are not limited to:
Imitating a slash of the throat;
Resembling the firing of a weapon;
Bowing at the waist;
Punching one’s own chest excessively;
Crossing one’s arms in front of the chest;
Placing one’s hand by the ear as if to indicate that the player cannot hear the spectators;
Diving into the end zone when unchallenged by an opponent;
Entering the end zone with an unnatural stride (e.g., high stepping);
Going significantly beyond the end line to interact with spectators;
Standing over a prone player in a taunting manner;
Attempting to make the ball spin as if it were a top;
Performing a choreographed act with a teammate(s) (e.g., pretending to take a photo, falling down in unison); and
Entering the field of play by coaches or substitutes in protest of officials' calls.
Additionally, the committee added language to the rule that reads: "Spontaneous celebrating with teammates on the field of play, provided it is not prolonged, taunting or intended to bring attention to the individual player, is allowed."

Conference changes and new programs

I-AA team wins over I-A teams
September 1 – Northwestern State 27, Louisiana–Monroe 23
September 17 – UC Davis 20, Stanford 17

Conference standings

Conference champions

Automatic berths

Invitation

Abstains

Postseason

NCAA Division I-AA playoff bracket

* Host institution

SWAC Championship Game

Final poll standings

Standings are from The Sports Network final 2005 poll.

References